Uljana Wolf is a German poet and translator (from English and Polish) known for exploring multilingualism in her work. Wolf works in both Berlin and New York. She teaches German at New York University.
Uljana Wolf was born in East Berlin in 1979. She studied German Studies, cultural studies and English Literature in Berlin and Krakow.

Prizes 
 Peter-Huchel-Preis (2006)
 Dresdner Lyrikpreis (2006)
 Erlanger Prize for Poetry as Translation (2015)
 Adelbert von Chamisso Prize (2016)
 Villa Massimo fellowship (2017/2018)

Works in German 
 Kochanie ich habe Brot gekauft. Gedichte. kookbooks (2005)
 Falsche Freunde. Gedichte. kookbooks (2009)
 Box Office. Stiftung Lyrik-Kabinett (2009)
 Sonne von Ort, a bilingual collaborative erasure of Elizabeth Barrett Browning's Sonnets from the Portuguese and their German translations by Rainer Maria Rilke, in collaboration with Christian Hawkey) (2012)
 Meine schönste Lengevitch. Prosagedichte. kookbooks (2013)

Works in English translation 
 False Friends translated by Susan Bernofsky, Ugly Duckling Presse (2009)
 i mean i dislike that fate that i was made to where translated by Sophie Seita, Wonder (2015)
 Subsisters translated by Sophie Seita, Belladonna* (2017)

References

21st-century German poets
1979 births
New York University faculty
Humboldt University of Berlin alumni
Living people
German women poets
German translators
21st-century German women writers
21st-century German translators